The 2012 FIBA Europe Under-16 Championship for Women Division C was the 8th edition of the Division C of the FIBA U16 Women's European Championship, the third tier of the European women's under-16 basketball championship. It was played in Gibraltar from 17 to 22 July 2012. Iceland women's national under-16 basketball team won the tournament.

Participating teams

First round

Group A

Group B

5th–8th place playoffs

Championship playoffs

Final standings

References

2012
2012–13 in European women's basketball
FIBA U16
Sports competitions in Gibraltar
FIBA